Nord-Troms og Senja District Court is a district court located in Troms, Norway. This court is based at two different courthouses which are located in Tromsø and Finnsnes. The court serves the northern and central parts of Troms which includes cases from 13 municipalities. The court in Tromsø accepts cases from the municipalities of Balsfjord, Karlsøy, Kåfjord, Lyngen, Nordreisa, Skjervøy, Storfjord, and Tromsø. The court in Finnsnes accepts cases from the municipalities of Bardu, Dyrøy, Målselv, Senja, and Sørreisa. The court is subordinate to the Hålogaland Court of Appeal.

The court is led by a chief judge and several other judges. The court is a court of first instance. Its judicial duties are mainly to settle criminal cases and to resolve civil litigation as well as bankruptcy. The administration and registration tasks of the court include death registration, issuing certain certificates, performing duties of a notary public, and officiating civil wedding ceremonies. Cases from this court are heard by a combination of professional judges and lay judges.

History
This court was established on 26 April 2021 after the old Senja District Court and Nord-Troms District Court were merged into one court. Kvænangen Municipality was part of the old Nord-Troms District Court, but on this date it was transferred to the Vestre Finnmark District Court. The new district court system continues to use the courthouses from the predecessor courts.

References

District courts of Norway
2021 establishments in Norway
Organisations based in Tromsø
Organisations based in Finnsnes